A list of University of Queensland people, the University of Queensland has numerous notable alumni and faculty.

Notable alumni

Academia

Patsy Yates, registered nurse specialized in palliative care, Distinguished Professor and Executive Dean of the Faculty of Health,  Queensland University of Technology (Brisbane)

Arts
George Washington Carver

Business
Richard Goodmanson, former COO of Dupont; Board of Qantas
Sir Ronald Gordon Jackson AK, businessman
Andrew N. Liveris, CEO of Dow Chemical Company, second largest chemical manufacturer in the world
Mark Hutchinson, former CEO of GE Europe
Vaine Nooana-Arioka, Executive Director of the Bank of the Cook Islands

Judicial

Media

Medicine
Graham Colditz, chronic disease epidemiologist, one of the global top three most cited academics
Michael Gabbett, clinical geneticist
Adele Green, epidemiologist
Jian Zhou, co-inventor of Gardasil
Mary Mahoney, medical practitioner and academic

Military
General Peter Gration, former Chief of the Defence Force and Chief of the General Staff
Major General rtd Jim Molan

Politics

Premiers

State Members of Parliament

Federal Members of Parliament

Local Government
Sallyanne Atkinson, politician and first female Lord Mayor of Brisbane

Outside Australia
Ernest Aderman, Member of Parliament in New Zealand
Prof. Ranjith Bandara, Member of Parliament in Sri Lanka 
Tan Sri Khalid Ibrahim, 14th Chief Minister of Selangor, Malaysia
Taneti Maamau, current President of Kiribati. 
Ahmed Shaheed, former Maldives Minister of Foreign Affairs and former Special Rapporteur on Human Rights in Iran
Lee Boon Yang, former Singaporean Cabinet Minister

Public service
Francis Patrick Donovan, diplomat and jurist
Max Moore-Wilton, former head of the Department of Prime Minister and Cabinet

Sport

Vice Regal
Those listed here may also be listed elsewhere, notably Politics and Public Service.

Other
Aila Inkero Keto, conservationist; recognized in the United Nations Environment Program's Global 500 Roll of Honour 1988
Elizabeth Powell, scientist
Lilla Watson, Indigenous Australian activist, visual artist and academic
Ken Ham, creationist; founder of Answers in Genesis and the Creation Museum
Karen Gallman, Miss Intercontinental 2018

Notable past and present staff

Administration

Chancellors
1910 – 1915 – Sir William MacGregor
1915 – 1922 – Sir Pope Alexander Cooper
1922 – 1925 – Lt-Col. Sir Matthew Nathan
1925 – 1927 –  Andrew Joseph Thynne
1927 – 1944 –  Sir James Blair
1944 – 1953 –  William Forgan Smith
1953 – 1957 –  Otto Hirschfeld
1957 – 1966 – Sir Albert Axon
1966 – 1976 – Sir Alan Mansfield
1977 – 1985 – Sir Walter Campbell
1985 – 1992 – Sir James Foots
1993 – 2009 – Sir Llewellyn Edwards
2009 – 2015 – John Story 
2016 – 2016 – Jane Wilson (Acting)
2016–present – Peter Varghese

Vice Chancellors
1910 – 1916 – Reginald Heber Roe
1916 – 1925 –  Andrew Joseph Thynne
1925 – 1938 –  William Nathaniel Robertson
1938 – 1959 – John Douglas Story
1960 – 1969 – Sir Fred Schonell
1970 – 1977 – Sir Zelman Cowen
1979 – 1996 – Brian Wilson, Australia's longest serving Vice-Chancellor
1996 – 2007 –  John A. Hay
2008 – 2012 –  Paul Greenfield
2012 – 2012 –  Deborah Terry (Acting)
2012 – 2020 – Peter Høj
2020–present - Deborah Terry

See also
:Category:University of Queensland alumni
 University of Queensland Union (UQU)

References



Queensland
University of Queensland
University